The 2016–17 Baltimore Blast season is the twenty-fifth season of the Baltimore Blast professional indoor soccer club. The Blast, an Eastern Division team in the Major Arena Soccer League, play their home games at Royal Farms Arena in downtown Baltimore, Maryland.

The team is led by owner Edwin F. Hale, Sr. and head coach Danny Kelly. The Blast entered the season as defending champions as they defeated the Sonora Suns in the Ron Newman Cup finals in April 2016.  Following an 8-4 victory on February 17 over the Syracuse Silver Knights, Baltimore clinched a playoff berth in the Eastern Division for the 2017 Ron Newman Cup playoffs. The Blast then clinched the regular-season Eastern Division championship after a 5-4 overtime win in Syracuse on February 24.

The Blast finished the regular season 14-6 and defeated Harrisburg, Milwaukee and Sonora in the postseason, successfully defending their title en route to the team's ninth championship (including one won by the original Blast franchise). Vini Dantas received the MASL Finals MVP.

History
Launched in July 1992 as the Baltimore Spirit, an expansion team in the second National Professional Soccer League for the 1992–93 season, the team replaced the original Baltimore Blast which folded earlier in 1992 when the first Major Indoor Soccer League shut down. Ed Hale, an owner of the original Blast, bought the Spirit in July 1998 and changed the name to Baltimore Blast. In 2001, the team was a founding member of the second MISL. When that league shut down in 2008, they co-founded the National Indoor Soccer League which, one season later, became the third MISL.

After the 2013-14 season, Baltimore was one of three teams that left the MISL, leading to the league's collapse. Along with five other former MISL teams, the Blast joined the teams of the Professional Arena Soccer League, which was then rebranded as the Major Arena Soccer League. With the Waza Flo folding and the launch of the Florida Tropics SC, the MASL Eastern Division for the 2016-17 season consists of the defending MASL Ron Newman Cup Champion Baltimore Blast, former MISL club Syracuse Silver Knights, former PASL club Harrisburg Heat, and the expansion Tropics.

Off-field moves
In the offseason, the Baltimore Blast, Harrisburg Heat, and St. Louis Ambush left the MASL, and joined the expansion Florida Tropics SC to form the Indoor Professional League. The Blast, Heat and Ambush re-joined the MASL in August 2016, with the Tropics being considered an expansion franchise for the MASL.

Schedule

Regular season

Post-season

Personnel

Team roster
As of January 13, 2017

Staff
The team's coaching staff includes head coach Danny Kelly, assistant coach David Bascome, athletic trainer Heather Kohlbus, physical therapist Paul Ernst, team doctor Dr. Richard Levine, and equipment manager Mark Meszaros. The Blast front office includes owner Edwin F. Hale, Sr., team president and general manager Kevin Healey, assistant general manager Mike Conway, and marketing coordinator Stephen Cooke.

Statistics

Top scorers
Last updated on March 5, 2017. Source:

External links
Baltimore Blast official website
Baltimore Blast at The Baltimore Sun

References

Baltimore Blast
2016–17 Major Arena Soccer League season
2017 in sports in Maryland
2016 in sports in Maryland